Pseudohemiculter hainanensis is a species of freshwater ray-finned fish from the family Cyprinidae, the carps and minnows from south east Asia. It occurs in the Yuanjiang, Zhujiang, Hainan Island, and middle reaches of Changjiang River in China and Vietnam.

References

Cyprinid fish of Asia
Pseudohemiculter
Fish described in 1900